Franklin Township is one of the twelve townships of Fulton County, Ohio, United States.  The 2010 census found 743 people in the township.

Geography
Located in the western part of the county, it borders the following townships:
Gorham Township - north
Chesterfield Township - northeast corner
Dover Township - east
Clinton Township - southeast corner
German Township - south
Brady Township, Williams County - west
Mill Creek Township, Williams County - northwest

No municipalities are located in Franklin Township.

Name and history
It is one of twenty-one Franklin Townships statewide.

A couple miles north of the Ohio Turnpike, automobile drivers find an abrupt jog in Ohio State Route 66. Severe jogs are also in the township's other north–south roads, County Roads 19, 20, 21, 22, and 23. It happens where they intersect the "Old State Line," originally surveyed as the Ordinance line. Michigan once considered the northern part of Ohio, a difference of about eight miles known as the Toledo Strip, as its own. Ohio and Michigan came to blows in an 1835-1836 confrontation between the state militias known as the Toledo War. There were no casualties.

Government
The township is governed by a three-member board of trustees, who are elected in November of odd-numbered years to a four-year term beginning on the following January 1. Two are elected in the year after the presidential election and one is elected in the year before it. There is also an elected township fiscal officer, who serves a four-year term beginning on April 1 of the year after the election, which is held in November of the year before the presidential election. Vacancies in the fiscal officership or on the board of trustees are filled by the remaining trustees.

Attractions

The Tiffin River Wildlife Area offers hunting and bird watching in the flood plain of the Tiffin River. Harrison Lake State Park borders the north edge of the township at County Road M.

Public services

Public Schools

Students from the township are served by the following public local school districts:

 Archbold Area Local School District 
 Fayette Local School District

Mail

Mail is delivered in the township by the following U.S. Post Office locations:

 Archbold, Ohio 43502
 Fayette, Ohio 43521
 Wauseon, Ohio 43567
 West Unity, Ohio 43570

Telephone

Most of the township lies within the Fayette telephone exchange, which is served by Frontier North, with telephone numbers using the following Numbering Plan Codes:

 419-237
 419-500
 567-404

A smaller eastern portion of the township is within the Wauseon telephone exchange, which is served by UTO (United Telephone Company of Ohio,) doing business as CenturyLink, with telephone numbers using the following Numbering Plan Codes:

 419-330
 419-335
 419-337
 419-388
 419-404
 419-583
 419-590

Electric

Toledo Edison and Midwest Energy Cooperative serves the township with electricity.

Highways
Ohio Turnpike Exit 25 intersects Ohio State Route 66 that runs through the township.

 Ohio Turnpike

References

External links
County website

Townships in Fulton County, Ohio
Townships in Ohio